USS Durham (LKA-114) was a Charleston-class amphibious cargo ship in service with the United States Navy from 1969 to 1994. She was sunk as a target in August 2020.

History
USS Durham was named after Durham, North Carolina. She served as a commissioned ship for 24 years and 9 months, and earned a total of 15 awards and campaign ribbons for her service. She was laid down as AKA-114 at Newport News Shipbuilding and Dry Dock Co., Newport News, VA, and redesignated LKA-114 on 1 January 1969. She was commissioned on 24 May 1969.

In April 1975, Durham participated in Operation Frequent Wind, the evacuation of Saigon at the end of the Vietnam War.

In the Gulf War, she was part of an 18-ship amphibious task force that was the largest such force since the Korean War. The task force arrived on station in the North Arabian Sea on 12 January 1991.

The ship was decommissioned on 25 February 1994. She was sunk by HMAS Stuart and her embarked MH-60R Seahawk on 30 August 2020 as part of a live fire exercise during Exercise RIMPAC 2020.

See also
List of ships sunk by missiles

References
There is no Dictionary of American Naval Fighting Ships (DANFS) entry for the ship.

External links

Naval History Center Gulf War Chronology, January 1991
NavSource Online: AKA / LKA-114 Durham
Military.com: USS Durham
51 Years of AKAs

 

Charleston-class amphibious cargo ships
Cold War amphibious warfare vessels of the United States
Vietnam War amphibious warfare vessels of the United States
Gulf War ships of the United States
Durham, North Carolina
1968 ships
Ships built in Newport News, Virginia